Sir Anthony John Habgood (born 8 November 1946) is a British businessman. From 1991 to 2005, he was chief executive of Bunzl. He was also the chairman of Whitbread from 2005 to 2014, RELX Group and of the Court of the Bank of England. He has been described in the Financial Times as "the City's go-to grandee."

Early life
Anthony John Habgood was born on 8 November 1946, the son of John Michael Habgood MC and his wife, Margaret Diana Middleton, née Dalby. He was educated at Gresham's School, Norfolk. He has a bachelor's degree from Cambridge University (Gonville and Caius College), and a master's degree in industrial administration from Carnegie Mellon University.

Career
He joined Boston Consulting Group in 1970 and became a director in 1977.

From 1991 to 2005, Habgood was chief executive, then chairman of Bunzl, growing turnover from continuing operations from £500 million to £2.9 billion, and improving profits by a factor of 34, and "is widely credited with transforming Bunzl".

Habgood was chairman of Whitbread plc from 2005 to 2014 and of Mölnlycke Health Care from 2006 to 2007 while it was owned by the private equity house APAX Partners. He has been chairman of RELX Group (formerly Reed Elsevier), a multinational information and analytics company, since June 2009. He has been chairman of Preqin Holding Limited since November 2011.

Past non-executive directorships include NatWest Bank plc, Powergen plc and Marks and Spencer plc

He was senior non-executive director of Norfolk and Norwich University Hospitals NHS Foundation Trust from 2006 until March 2013, and was chair of Norwich Research Park between March 2013 and March 2016.

In March 2014, Habgood was appointed chairman of the Court of the Bank of England.

Habgood was appointed a Knight Bachelor in the 2018 New Year Honours for services to UK Industry.

Views on strategy
Habgood has said that a key factor in strategy is determining which elements of a group portfolio have good growth characteristics, and focusing on these.

Personal life
On 29 May 1974, Habgood married Nancy Atkinson, the daughter of Ray Nelson Atkinson of San Mateo, California, US. They have three children, and split their time between Chelsea and Norfolk.

References

External links
2010 BBC "The Bottom Line" video interview

Living people
British chairpersons of corporations
1946 births
Tepper School of Business alumni
Alumni of Gonville and Caius College, Cambridge
People educated at Gresham's School
Dutch chairpersons of corporations
Knights Bachelor
Bunzl people